Virgin and Child before a Landscape is an undated oil on panel painting by Cima da Conegliano, now in the Philadelphia Museum of Art, which acquired it as part of the John G. Johnson collection in 1917.

References

Paintings of the Madonna and Child by Cima da Conegliano
Paintings in the collection of the Philadelphia Museum of Art